Weerberg is a municipality in the Schwaz district in the Austrian state of Tyrol.

Geography
Important peaks in the parish territory are the 2,762 m high Rastkogel and the 2,506 m high Gilfert, both in the Tux Alps.

References

Cities and towns in Schwaz District